French Silk is a romance novel written by Sandra Brown. It was published in 1992, and made the New York Times bestseller list.  The novel is set in New Orleans and revolves around the murder of a televangelist; the suspects include the female founder of the "French Silk" mail order catalog whom the preacher had targeted as sinful.

It was also made into a 1994 TV movie starring Susan Lucci and R. Lee Ermey.

The book was the first of Brown's novels to be released in hardcover, and the first to be made into a movie.  Its first print run was 150,000 copies.

References

External links
 
 French Silk at Sandra Brown.net

1992 American novels
American romance novels
American novels adapted into films
Contemporary romance novels
Novels set in New Orleans